CallFire Inc. is a cloud telephony services provider (SaaS) headquartered in Santa Monica, California, known locally as Silicon Beach. CallFire develops web-based VoIP products and services as a business-to-business (B2B) service for small and medium-sized businesses (SMB's).

History 

The company was incorporated in 2006 by Dinesh Ravishanker, Vijesh Mehta, and Komnieve Singh. Punit Shah and T. J. Thinakaran came on board in 2006 and 2007 respectively to round out the founding team. Dan Retzlaff, James Nguyen, Shane Neman were hired during the initial years, and Ronald Burr was hired in spring 2012. The company provides cloud communication services such as voice broadcasting, power dialing, and Interactive Voice Response.

Reception 

In 2010, CallFire was ranked No. 285 on Inc. Magazine’s 29th annual List of America’s Fastest Growing Private Companies.

CallFire was ranked No. 15 within the Telecommunications industry in the Los Angeles metropolitan region. Much of CallFire’s annual growth is attributed to “the growth in calls and use of its service in U.S. elections as well as Hurricane Sandy”.

References

External links
 CallFire website

Cloud communication platforms
Cloud applications
Cloud platforms